Mariam Anwar Butt (born 18 April 1987) is a Pakistani former cricketer who played as a right-handed batter. She appeared in one Test match and 12 One Day Internationals for Pakistan in 2003 and 2004.

References

External links
 
 

1987 births
Living people
Pakistani women cricketers
Pakistan women Test cricketers
Pakistan women One Day International cricketers
Cricketers from Sialkot